The year 1802 in archaeology involved some significant events.

Excavations

Explorations

Publications
 Vivant Denon - Voyage dans la Basse et la Haute Egypte pendant les campagnes du général Bonaparte; includes first publication of the Dendera zodiac.
 Johann Jahn - Biblische Archäologie.

Other events
 The Rosetta Stone arrives at the British Museum and first goes on public display.
 Georg Friedrich Grotefend makes the first decipherment of cuneiform.

Births
 Juan Galindo, explorer and writer of early accounts of the ruins of the Maya civilization (d. 1839).

Deaths

References

Archaeology
Archaeology by year
Archaeology
Archaeology